Laguna Creek is a former census-designated place (CDP) in Sacramento County, California, United States. It is now part of the incorporated City of Elk Grove.

Geography
Laguna Creek is located at  (38.423872, -121.427421).

Demographics
As of the census of 2000, there were 34,309 people, 11,314 households, and 9,153 families residing in the CDP. The racial makeup of the CDP was 59.10% White, 9.70% African American, 0.66% Native American, 17.99% Asian, 0.36% Pacific Islander, 5.48% from other races, and 6.71% from two or more races. Hispanic or Latino of any race were 14.53% of the population.

There were 11,314 households, out of which 52.0% had children under the age of 18 living with them, 64.8% were married couples living together, 11.8% had a female householder with no husband present, and 19.1% were non-families. 14.6% of all households were made up of individuals, and 1.9% had someone living alone who was 65 years of age or older.  The average household size was 3.03 and the average family size was 3.38.

In the CDP, the population was spread out, with 33.8% under the age of 18, 5.9% from 18 to 24, 37.8% from 25 to 44, 17.8% from 45 to 64, and 4.6% who were 65 years of age or older.  The median age was 32 years. For every 100 females, there were 94.8 males.  For every 100 females age 18 and over, there were 89.4 males.

The median income for a household in the CDP was $67,447, and the median income for a family was $70,804. Males had a median income of $51,604 versus $40,895 for females. The per capita income for the CDP was $25,280.  About 3.4% of families and 4.3% of the population were below the poverty line, including 4.6% of those under age 18 and 5.7% of those age 65 or over.

Politics
In the state legislature, Laguna Creek is in the 1st and 5th Senate Districts. The first is vacant due to the death of the late Dave Cox and the fifth is represented by Democrat Lois Wolk respectively, and in the 10th Assembly District, represented by Democrat Alyson Huber.

References

Neighborhoods in Sacramento County, California
Former census-designated places in California
Populated places in the Sacramento metropolitan area
Elk Grove, California